Danielle Hill (born 27 September 1999) is an Irish swimmer from Northern Ireland. She competed in the women's 100 metre backstroke at the 2020 Summer Olympics. On 24 June 2021 she set a new Irish national record with a time of 1:00.18 in the 100m backstroke, simultaneously posting an Olympic qualifying time for the delayed Tokyo Games.

References

External links
 

1999 births
Living people
Irish female swimmers
Olympic swimmers of Ireland
Swimmers at the 2020 Summer Olympics
Sportspeople from Belfast
Swimmers at the 2014 Commonwealth Games
Swimmers at the 2018 Commonwealth Games
Swimmers at the 2022 Commonwealth Games
Commonwealth Games competitors for Northern Ireland
21st-century Irish women